Kustom Karnal Blackxploitation is the fifth studio album by Washington, D.C. Indie band Unrest, released on February 15, 1990 by Caroline Records. The band supported the album with a North American tour.

Critical reception

Reviewing a reissue of the album, the Winnipeg Sun wrote that frontman Mark Robinson "shows he was a precursor to both Pavement and [Jon] Spencer, spitting out songs that toggle between the skewed eccentricity of the former and the garage-rawk skronk of the latter... If you're looking for the missing link between Slanted and Enchanted and Orange—and we'll presume those titles ring a bell—Unrest should be on your want list."

Track listing

Personnel
Adapted from the Kustom Karnal Blackxploitation liner notes.

Unrest
Phil Krauth – drums
Dave Park – bass guitar, guitar
Mark Robinson – lead vocals, guitar, bass guitar

Additional musicians and production
Wharton Tiers – production, recording
Terry Tolkin – backing vocals

Release history

References

External links
 

Unrest (band) albums
1990 albums
Caroline Records albums
TeenBeat Records albums
Albums produced by Wharton Tiers